George B. "Jeb" Spaulding (born December 28, 1952) is an American politician and the former chancellor of the Vermont State Colleges.  He previously served as Vermont State Treasurer and as Governor Peter Shumlin's secretary of administration.

Biography
Spaulding was the founder of radio station WNCS FM 104.7 in Montpelier and was a general partner in Precision Media, Inc.  He also served as the director of career and workforce development at the Vermont Department of Education, and as director of the Vermont Academy of Science and Technology at Vermont Technical College. He has been an adjunct professor of communications at Norwich University.

Previously, Spaulding represented the Washington County district for eight terms (1985–2001) in the Vermont State Senate, where he chaired the Appropriations Committee, the Education Committee, the Joint Fiscal Committee and the Joint Committee on Administrative Rules.  In 1984, he defeated Republican incumbent H. Edsel Hughes to win one of the district's three seats.  In 2000, he did not run for reelection, and Republican Phil Scott won the seat Spaulding vacated.

Spaulding served four terms as state treasurer (2003–2011) and, in 2009, also served as president of the National Association of State Treasurers.

Spaulding considered running for Governor of Vermont in 2010, but opted instead to seek re-election to a fifth term as state treasurer.  Spaulding faced token opposition and won re-election with 90% of the vote.

On November 15, 2010, Gov.-Elect Peter Shumlin nominated Spaulding to be the incoming Secretary of Administration, the senior cabinet position in the executive branch. He resigned as treasurer in January, 2011.

In January 2015 Spaulding left the administration secretary's post to become chancellor of the Vermont State Colleges.

On April 17, 2020, Spaulding announced his plans to close several Vermont State Colleges campuses including Vermont Tech and Northern Vermont University due to funding issues related to student and teacher absence during the COVID-19 outbreak.

Shortly after announcing his plans, Spaulding resigned his post as Chancellor of the Vermont State Colleges due to widespread backlash surrounding the proposal.

Notes

1952 births
Living people
State cabinet secretaries of Vermont
State treasurers of Vermont
Democratic Party Vermont state senators
People from Montpelier, Vermont
University of Vermont alumni
Antioch College alumni